"I Need You So" is a song written and performed by Ivory Joe Hunter. His original recording of it reached number one on the Billboard R&B chart in 1950, staying there for two weeks.

Cover versions  
"I Need You So" was also recorded by Elvis Presley for his 1957 album, Loving You.
In 1965, Chuck Jackson and Maxine Brown recorded their version for the album, Saying Something.

References

Elvis Presley songs
Songs written by Ivory Joe Hunter
1950 songs